Tierra del Fuego (Spanish for "Land of the Fire", rarely also Fireland in English) is an archipelago off the southernmost tip of the South American mainland, across the Strait of Magellan. Tierra del Fuego is divided between Chile and Argentina, with the latter controlling the eastern half of the main island and the former the western half plus the islands south of Beagle Channel and the southernmost islands. The southernmost extent of the archipelago is just north of latitude 56°S.

The earliest known human settlement in Tierra del Fuego dates to approximately 8,000 BC. Europeans first explored the islands during Ferdinand Magellan's expedition of 1520. Tierra del Fuego and similar namings stem from sightings of the many bonfires that the natives built. 

Settlement by those of European descent and the displacement of the native populations did not begin until the second half of the nineteenth century, at the height of the Patagonian sheep farming boom and of the local gold rush. Today, petroleum extraction dominates economic activity in the north of Tierra del Fuego, while tourism, manufacturing, and Antarctic logistics are important in the south.

History

Prehistory

The earliest human settlement occurred approximately 8,000 BC. The Yaghan were some of the earliest known humans to settle in Tierra del Fuego. Archeological sites with characteristics of their culture have been found at locations such as Navarino Island.

European exploration

The name Tierra del Fuego was given by the Portuguese explorer Ferdinand Magellan while sailing for the Spanish Crown in 1520; he was the first European to visit these lands. He believed he was seeing the many fires (fuego in Spanish) of the Yaghan, which were visible from the sea, and that the "Indians" were waiting in the forests to ambush his armada.

In 1525, Francisco de Hoces was the first to speculate that Tierra del Fuego was one or more islands rather than part of what was then called Terra Australis. Francis Drake in 1578 and a Dutch East India Company expedition in 1616 learned more about the geography. The latter expedition named Cape Horn at Hornos Island.

The three who survived the voyage were taken to London to meet the king and queen and were, for a time, celebrities. They returned to Tierra del Fuego in the Beagle with FitzRoy and Charles Darwin, who made extensive notes about his visit to the islands.

European colonization and extinction of Native Americans (1860–1910)

During the second half of the nineteenth century, the archipelago began to come under Chilean and Argentine influence. Both countries sought to claim the whole archipelago based on de jure Spanish colonial titles. Salesian Catholic missions were established in Río Grande and Dawson Island.

Anglican missionaries, who had established missions on Keppel Island in 1855, established new missions in 1870 at Ushuaia. These missions continued to operate through the nineteenth century. Missionary Thomas Bridges (1842–1898) learned the native language and compiled a 30,000-word Yaghan grammar and dictionary while he worked at Ushuaia. It was published in the 20th century and considered an important ethnological work.

An 1879 Chilean expedition led by Ramón Serrano Montaner reported large amounts of placer gold in the streams and river beds of Tierra del Fuego. This prompted massive immigration to the main island between 1883 and 1909. Numerous Argentines, Chileans, and Croatians settled on the main island, leading to increased conflicts with native Selk'nam. These late nineteenth century gold rushes led to the founding of numerous small settlements by immigrants such as the Argentine settlements of Ushuaia and Río Grande and the Chilean settlements of Porvenir and Puerto Toro.

Julius Popper, a Romanian explorer, was one of the most successful entrepreneurs in the region. Granted rights by the Argentine government to exploit any gold deposits he found in Tierra del Fuego, Popper has been identified as a central figure in the Selk'nam genocide.

Following contact with Europeans, the native Selk'nam and Yaghan populations were greatly reduced by unequal conflict and persecution by settlers, by infectious diseases to which the indigenous people had no immunity, and by mass transfer to the Salesian mission of Dawson Island. Despite the efforts of the missionaries, many natives died. Today, only a few Selk'nam remain. Some of the few remaining Yaghan have settled in Villa Ukika in Navarino Island; others have scattered throughout Chile and Argentina.

Following the signing of the Boundary Treaty of 1881, Tierra del Fuego was divided between Argentina and Chile; previously, it had been claimed in its entirety by both countries.

Recent history (1940–present)

In 1945 a division of Chilean CORFO (Spanish acronym for Production Development Corporation) engaged in oil exploration made a breakthrough discovery of oil in northern Tierra del Fuego. Extraction began in 1949, and in 1950, the state of Chile created ENAP (National Petroleum Company) to deal with oil extraction and prospecting. Until 1960, most oil extracted in Chile came from Tierra del Fuego.

During the 1940s Chile and Argentina formulated their Antarctic claims. The governments realized the key role of Tierra del Fuego's geographical proximity in backing their claims, as well as, in supplying their Antarctic bases. In the 1950s, the Chilean military founded Puerto Williams to counter Ushuaia's monopoly as the only settlement in the Beagle Channel, a zone where Argentina disputed the 1881 borders.

In the 1960s and 1970s, sovereignty claims by Argentina over Picton, Lennox, and Nueva Islands in Tierra del Fuego led the two countries to the brink of war in December 1978. In response to the threat of an Argentine invasion, minefields were deployed and bunkers built on the Chilean side in some areas of Tierra del Fuego. The threat of war caused the Chilean Pinochet regime to give logistical support and information to the British during the Falklands War of 1982. Chilean radar supplied the British with information on Argentine jet movements in Tierra del Fuego, from where the Argentine Air Force launched raids on targets in the Falklands.

In 1986, the Argentine congress decided that the Argentine part of Tierra del Fuego should be a new province; the law was not promulgated until 26 April 1990.

Geography

Of the main island the westernmost 29,484.7 km2 (11,384, 61.43%) belongs to Chile, and 18,507.3 km2 (7,146, 38.57%) belongs to Argentina. The archipelago is divided by an east–west channel, the Beagle Channel, immediately south of the main island. The largest islands south of the Beagle Channel are Hoste and Navarino.

The western part of the main island, and almost all the other islands, belong to Chile. They are part of the Magallanes y Antártica Chilena Region, the capital and chief town of which is Punta Arenas, situated on the mainland across the strait. The largest Chilean towns are Porvenir, capital of the Chilean Province of Tierra del Fuego, located on the main island, and, on Navarino Island, Puerto Williams, which is the capital of the Antártica Chilena Province. 

Puerto Toro lies a few kilometers south of Puerto Williams. Arguably, it is the southernmost village in the world. The mostly uninhabited islands north and west of the main island are part of Magallanes Province.

The eastern part of the main island and a few small islands in the Beagle Channel belong to Argentina. They are part of the Tierra del Fuego, Antarctic Territory and South Atlantic Islands Province, whose capital is Ushuaia, the largest city of the archipelago. The other important city in the region is Río Grande on the Atlantic coast.

The Cordillera Darwin in the southwestern part of the main island contains many glaciers that reach the ocean.

The topography of Tierra del Fuego can be divided into four regions: an outer archipelago region to the south and west, a mountainous region in the south, a plains region plus a sub-Andean zone in-between the last two zones.

Geology

The geology of the archipelago is characterized by the effects of the Andean orogeny and the repeated Pleistocene glaciations. The geology of the island can be divided into large east–west-oriented units. The southwestern islands of the archipelago, including Cape Horn, are part of the South Patagonian Batholith, while the Cordillera Darwin and the area around the Beagle Channel form the principal mountain range hosting the highest mountains. The Magallanes fold and thrust belt extends north of Almirantazgo Fjord and Fagnano Lake, and north of this lies the Magallanes foreland, an old sedimentary basin that hosts hydrocarbon reserves. Orthogneiss dated at 525 million years is known to underlie some of the oil wells in northern Tierra del Fuego.

The Magallanes–Fagnano Fault, a sinistral strike slip fault crosses the southern part of the main island from west to east. It is an active fault, located inside and parallel to the Fuegian fold and thrust belt, and marks the boundary between a southern belt of Paleozoic meta sediments and a northern Mesozoic belt of sedimentary sequences. Fagnano Lake occupies a glacier-carved depression in a pull-apart basin that has developed along the Magallanes-Fagnano Fault zone.

Podzols and inceptisols occur beneath Nothofagus betuloides forests in Tierra del Fuego.

Climate 

The Tierra del Fuego region has a subpolar oceanic climate (Köppen climate classification Cfc) with short, cool summers and long, wet, moderately mild winters: the precipitation averages  a year in the far west, but precipitation decreases rapidly to the eastern side. Temperatures are steady throughout the year: in Ushuaia they hardly surpass  in summers and average  in winters. Snowfall can occur in summer. The cold and wet summers help preserve the ancient glaciers. The southernmost islands possess a sub-antarctic climate typical of tundra that makes the growth of trees impossible. Some areas in the interior have a polar climate. Regions in the world with similar climates to southern Tierra del Fuego are: the Aleutian islands, Iceland, the Alaska Peninsula, the Faroe Islands, Macquarie Island, and the Heard and McDonald Islands.

Flora 
Only 30% of the islands have forests, which are classified as Magellanic subpolar. The northeastern portion of the region is made up of steppe and cool semi-desert.

Six species of tree are found in Tierra del Fuego: canelo or winter's bark (Drimys winteri), Maytenus magellanica, Pilgerodendron uviferum, the southernmost conifer in the world, and three kinds of southern beech: Nothofagus antarctica, Nothofagus pumilio, and the evergreen Nothofagus betuloides. Several kinds of fruit grow in open spaces in these forests, such as beach strawberry (Fragaria chiloensis var. chiloensis forma chiloensis) and calafate (Berberis buxifolia), which have long been gathered by both Native Americans and residents of European descent. They are the only forests in the world to have developed in a climate with such cold summers. Tree cover extends very close to the southernmost tip of South America. Winds are so strong that trees in wind-exposed areas grow into twisted shapes, inspiring people to call them "flag-trees". Tree vegetation extends to the southern tip of the region, Isla Hornos, although the Wollaston Islands are mostly covered by subantarctic tundra except in wind sheltered areas where the trees can survive.

Forests from Tierra del Fuego have expanded beyond local importance. These forests have been a source of trees that have been transplanted abroad in places with practically the same climate, but which originally, were devoid of trees, such as the Faroe Islands and nearby archipelagos. Most species were gathered from the coldest places in Tierra del Fuego, mainly sites with tundra borders. This effort resulted in positive changes, as the heavy winds and cool summers in the Faroe Islands did not allow the growth of trees from other regions in the world. The imported trees are used ornamentally, as curtains against wind, and for fighting erosion caused by storms and grazing in the Faroe Islands.

Fauna 

Among the most notable animals in the archipelago are austral parakeets, gulls, guanacos, foxes, kingfishers, condors, king penguins, owls, and firecrown hummingbirds.

Isla Grande de Tierra del Fuego is home to the southernmost known lizard in the World, the Liolaemus magellanicus. 

North American beavers, introduced during the 1940s, have proliferated and caused considerable damage to the island forests. The governments have established a wide-reaching program to trap and kill beavers in Tierra del Fuego.

Like the mainland of Chile and Argentina to the north, this archipelago boasts some of the finest trout fishing in the world. Sea-run brown trout often exceed , particularly in rivers such as the Rio Grande and the San Pablo, and in the Lago Fagnano. Much of this water is privately owned, with catch and release and fly fishing only.

Waters adjacent to Tierra del Fuego are very rich in cetacean diversity. Sightings of southern right whales in Tierra del Fuego have increased in the 2000s,  humpbacks, and some others such as blue whales, southern fins, southern seis, and southern minkes. Beagle Channel is a prominent area to watch rare, endemic dolphins, and the less-studied pygmy right whales.

Pinnipeds inhabiting the areas include South American sea lions (Otaria flavescens), South American fur seals (Arctophoca australis), the carnivorous and seal-eating leopard seals (Hydrurga leptonyx), and gigantic southern elephant seals (Mirounga leonine).

Economy 
Today, the main economic activities of the archipelago are fishing, extraction of natural gas and oil, sheep farming, and ecotourism. Tourism is gaining in importance and becoming increasingly important as it attracts numerous upmarket visitors. Much of the tourism is based on "southernmost" claims: for example, both Ushuaia and Puerto Williams claim to be the "southernmost city in the world". On the Argentine side of Tierra del Fuego, the government has promoted the establishment of several electronic companies via tributary exemptions, particularly in the city of Río Grande.

Energy production is a crucial economic activity. On the Argentine side of Tierra del Fuego during the 2005 to 2010 period, petroleum and natural gas extraction contributed to 20% of the region's economic output.

Tierra del Fuego in the Fine Arts 
 Alexander Buchan participated in the 1768–1771 first voyage of James Cook aboard , where he was one of the artists in the entourage of botanist Joseph Banks. Endeavour lay at anchor in the Bay of Good Success on 15 January 1769. An expedition in Terra Fuego in which he took part started from here.
 As a ship painter, Conrad Martens drew and created watercolor paintings in 1833 and 1834 during the second voyage of HMS Beagle in Tierra del Fuego.
 The French painter and lithographer Évremond de Bérard illustrated the travel journal "Le Tour du Monde" with Tierra del Fuego motifs in 1861.
 Rockwell Kent painted "more than twenty large pictures of Tierra del Fuego" during his stay in Tierra del Fuego in 1922 and 1923, as he reported in his autobiography It's Me O Lord: The Autobiography of Rockwell Kent.
 The German painter Ingo Kühl traveled to Tierra del Fuego three times, where he created paintings in a cycle entitled, Landscapes of the End of the World (2005)

See also 
 Alberto de Agostini National Park
 Beagle conflict
 Beaver eradication in Tierra del Fuego
 Mamihlapinatapai
 The Voyage of the Beagle
 Tierra del Fuego National Park
 Yaghan language

Notes

References 
 Bridges, Lucas. 1948. Uttermost Part of the Earth. Reprint with introduction by Gavin Young, Century Hutchinson, 1987. 
 Keynes, Richard. 2002. Fossils, Finches and Fuegians: Charles Darwin's Adventures and Discoveries on the Beagle, 1832–1836. HarperCollins Publishers, London. Reprint: 2003.
 Bollen, Patrick. 2000. "Tierra del Fuego" B/W Photobook. Lannoo Publishers, Tielt, Belgium.

External links

 Official website of Argentine Tierra del Fuego
 Chile Cultural Society – Tierra del Fuego
 

 
Archipelagoes of Argentina
Archipelagoes of Chile
Archipelagoes of the Atlantic Ocean
Archipelagoes of the Pacific Ocean
Islands of Magallanes Region
Landforms of Tierra del Fuego Province, Argentina
Patagonia
Natural regions of South America
Divided regions
Regions of Argentina
Regions of Chile
Regions of South America